Lee Ho-shun (born 22 June 1952) is a Taiwanese politician.

Education and early career
Lee attended Far East University and, later, Pacific Western University. He led the Tainan County Sports Federation and the Chinese Taipei Weightlifting Association.

Political career
Between 1998 and 2002, Lee was the speaker of the Tainan County Council. He won election to the fifth Legislative Yuan in 2001 as a Kuomintang candidate. However, he lost a party primary in 2004, and chose to launch an independent reelection bid. Lee quit the Kuomintang on 2 October 2004, and yielded his legislative seat to Huang Fung-shih sixteen days later. Lee joined the Non-Partisan Solidarity Union, and was reelected to the Sixth Legislative Yuan. During his second legislative term, the Taipei Society was critical of Lee's performance. He lost to Democratic Progressive Party candidate Huang Wei-cher in 2008.

References

1952 births
Living people
Kuomintang Members of the Legislative Yuan in Taiwan
Non-Partisan Solidarity Union Members of the Legislative Yuan
Members of the 5th Legislative Yuan
Members of the 6th Legislative Yuan
Party List Members of the Legislative Yuan
Tainan Members of the Legislative Yuan
Tainan City Councilors